Condé-sur-Vire (literally Condé on Vire) is a commune in the Manche department in Normandy in north-western France. On 1 January 2016, the former commune of Le Mesnil-Raoult was merged into Condé-sur-Vire. On 1 January 2017, the former commune of Troisgots was merged into Condé-sur-Vire.

Geography

Climate
Condé-sur-Vire has a oceanic climate (Köppen climate classification Cfb).

Heraldry

People
Among well known people born here is Father Jean de Brébeuf, a martyr and since 1930 a Catholic saint.

Twinning
In the late 1970s, arrangements were made for the twinning of Condé-sur-Vire with Bordon in Hampshire.  For several years, parties of civic leaders and school teachers would arrive in Bordon, accompanying 70 or more school children for a week of activities.

See also
 
Communes of the Manche department

References 

Condesurvire